Irwin Scott "Yank" Boyd (November 13, 1908 — November 12, 1979) was an American professional ice hockey player who played 97 games in the National Hockey League for the Boston Bruins and Detroit Red Wings between 1931 and 1944. The rest of his career, which lasted from 1929 to 1944, was spent in various minor leagues. He moved to Canada at the age of 17 to play against other high-skilled players of his age.

Career statistics

Regular season and playoffs

External links

Obituary at LostHockey.com

1908 births
1979 deaths
American men's ice hockey right wingers
Boston Bruins players
Boston Tigers (CAHL) players
Detroit Olympics (IHL) players
Detroit Red Wings players
Ice hockey players from Pennsylvania
London Tecumsehs players
Ontario Hockey Association Senior A League (1890–1979) players
People from Ardmore, Pennsylvania
Philadelphia Arrows players
Providence Reds
St. Paul Saints (AHA) players
Windsor Bulldogs (1929–1936) players